The Northampton Medieval Synagogue is an archaeological site and medieval synagogue building in Sheep Street,  Northampton, England.

The synagogue was discovered in 2010 by Marcus Roberts of National Anglo-Jewish Heritage Trail (JTrails) after many years of researching Northampton's medieval Jewish history. Records tell that the synagogue appeared to have survived the expulsion of Jews in 1290 and the great fire of Northampton in 1674. Town clerk records from 1751 describe the building as "very substantial; a fair stately hall."

The remains of the medieval synagogue include stone walls and a stone staircase located 12 feet underneath a kebab shop,  the Kebabish takeaway, and a neighbourhood pub.  A wall in the cellar of the pub, named "The Bear," was part of the ancient synagogue.

Northampton was among the largest medieval Jewish communities in England. Remnants of a Jewish cemetery have also been discovered by archaeologists.

References

External links
 Northampton's Medieval Jewish Community on Jewish Communities and Records - UK (hosted by jewishgen.org).

Archaeological sites in Northamptonshire
Jews and Judaism in England
Medieval synagogues in England
Synagogue
Synagogue